The Waitutu River is a river in southern Fiordland, New Zealand. It is the outlet of Lake Poteriteri to the sea.

See also
List of rivers of New Zealand

References

Rivers of Fiordland